Meldreth railway station serves the villages of Meldreth and Melbourn in Cambridgeshire, England.

Services 
All services at Meldreth are operated by Thameslink using  EMUs.

The typical off-peak service in trains per hour is:
 2 tph to 

On weekends, the service is reduced to hourly in each direction.

History 

On 1 August 2001 local celebrations marked the 150th anniversary of the station's opening in 1851, during the so-called Victorian Railway Mania.

References

External links 

Meldreth Railway Station at Meldreth Local History Group

Railway stations in Cambridgeshire
DfT Category E stations
Former Great Northern Railway stations
Railway stations in Great Britain opened in 1851
Railway stations served by Govia Thameslink Railway
1851 establishments in England